Amable is a French given name. Notable people with the name include:

 Amable Aristy (born 1949), Dominican politician and businessman
 Amable Audin (1899–1990), French archaeologist
 Amable Bapaume (1825–1895), French novelist, journalist and playwright
 Amable de Courtais (1790–1877), French soldier and politician
 Amable Guillaume Prosper Brugière, baron de Barante (1782–1866), French statesman and historian
 Amable Bélanger (1846–1919), Canadian iron founder, industrialist and community leader
 Amable Berthelot (1777–1847), Quebec lawyer, author and political figure
 Amable de Bourzeys (1606–1672), French churchman, writer, hellenist, and Academician
 Amable Dionne (1782–1852), Canadian businessman, seigneur and political figure
 Amable Éno, dit Deschamps (1785–1875), political figure in Quebec
 Amable Jodoin (1828–1880), businessman and political figure in Quebec
 Amable Jourdain (1788–1818), French historian and orientalist
 Amable Liñán (born 1934), Spanish aeronautical engineer
 Amable de Saint-Hilaire (born 1799), French dramatist
 Amable Tastu (1795–1885), French femme de lettres
 Amable Troude (1762–1824), French Navy officer of the Napoleonic Wars

French masculine given names